is a Japanese racing driver. He currently drives at the Super GT series in the GT500 category.

In 2007 he won the Super GT 500 championship, in the ARTA NSX with Ralph Firman.

Itō is also a regular presenter of Best Motoring.

24 Hours of Le Mans results

Racing record

Complete Super GT results

External links

SUPERGT.net – Driver information

1975 births
Living people
Japanese racing drivers
Japanese Formula 3 Championship drivers
Formula Nippon drivers
Super GT drivers
Team Kunimitsu drivers
Nakajima Racing drivers
Team Aguri drivers
Team LeMans drivers
TOM'S drivers
Mugen Motorsports drivers